Céline Lomez (born 11 May 1953) is a Canadian actress and singer.

Lomez started her show business career singing French-Canadian pop songs with her sister Liette, and the two gained popularity after their performance at the Festival du Disque in Quebec in 1968. Liette went on to join a trio called Toulouse. Lomez, however, was soon offered a role in the Denis Héroux film Here and Now (L'Initiation) (1970).  She was only 15 years old at the time.

She has also released two albums. One of her main hit songs was "L'amour dans les rangs de coton" (1974), a Louisiana zydeco-style ballad.

She went on to play Christopher Plummer's ill-fated girlfriend in the cult thriller The Silent Partner in 1978. She was originally set to star as Brooke Parsons in the 1983 cult horror film Curtains, but was asked to leave after shooting several scenes by producer Peter R. Simpson. The character was then taken over by actress Linda Thorson.

In 2004, Lomez published her autobiography, Pour quatorze dollars elles sont à vous?.

Filmography
Here and Now (L'Initiation) - 1970
Loving and Laughing - 1971
Apres-Ski (aka Sex in the Snow) - 1971
L'Apparition - 1972
Réjeanne Padovani - 1973
Don't Push It (Pousse mais pousse égal) - 1975
Gina - 1975
Stateline Motel - 1975
The Far Shore - 1976
The Silent Partner - 1978
Plague - 1979
The Spirit of Adventure: Night Flight (TV) - 1980
The Ivory Ape (TV) - 1980
Ça peut pas être l'hiver, on n'a même pas eu d'été - 1980
The Kiss - 1988
Charlotte et Léa (TV) - 1995
Sorry Charlie - 1996
The Revenge of the Woman in Black (La vengeance de la femme en noir) - 1997

References

External links

northernstars.ca

1953 births
Living people
Place of birth missing (living people)
Singers from Quebec
Canadian television actresses
Canadian women pop singers
Canadian film actresses
Actresses from Quebec